The Ruby Range is a subrange of the Sifton Ranges, located west of Spinnel Creek and east of Obo River in northern British Columbia, Canada.

References

Ruby Range in the Canadian Mountain Encyclopedia

Cassiar Mountains